Wabash Municipal Airport  is a public airport  southeast of Wabash, in Wabash County, Indiana. The airport was founded in May 1958.

References

External links 

 http://www.airnav.com/airport/KIWH
 https://wabashmunicipalairport.com/

Airports in Indiana
Transportation buildings and structures in Wabash County, Indiana